The following is a list of Radio Disney Music Award winners and nominees for Artist with the Best Style (formerly Best Style and Most Stylish Singer).

Winners and nominees

2000s

2010s

References

Style